Arijana Jaha (born 5 January 1979) is a Bosnian judoka. She competed in the women's half-lightweight event at the 2000 Summer Olympics.

References

External links
 

1979 births
Living people
Bosnia and Herzegovina female judoka
Olympic judoka of Bosnia and Herzegovina
Judoka at the 2000 Summer Olympics
Place of birth missing (living people)